Arcade Comics is an independent comic book company founded by former Image Comics mainstay Rob Liefeld and Jimmy Jay of "Jay Company Comics". This is Liefeld's 4th publishing label after Extreme Studios, Maximum Press and Awesome Comics. The company kicked off in 2003 with its first comic Youngblood: Genesis which was released at the San Diego Comic-Con International, 2003. This convention release would mark the start of Arcade's plan to release books on the convention circuit first. In theory, this proves that the book is out and saw print as well as allowing time for interest to be drummed up before the eventual Diamond Comics solicitation.

Books published
 ARCADE CONVENTION SPECIAL: Nitrogen/The Cross Special (Wizard World LA Con Exclusive)
 NitroGen #1
 NitroGen: Extreme Forces #1
 Supreme Sacrifice: Suprema #1
 Youngblood: Genesis #1-2
 Youngblood: Bloodsport #1-preview edition of 2
 Youngblood:Imperial #1
 Youngblood Maximum Edition

External links
 Rob Liefeld website
 Jay Company Comics